Karl Oskar Fjørtoft (born 26 July 1975 in Ålesund) is a Norwegian football coach and former player.

Club career
As an active player, Fjørtoft played for Hødd, Rosenborg BK, Molde FK, Swedish team Hammarby IF, Aalesund and Herd.

After the 2008 season, his contract with Aalesund was not renewed. In late December he was signed by SK Herd together with former teammate Lasse Olsen.

International career
Fjørtoft played a total of 37 games and scored four goals for Norway at international youth level. He played 2 games for Norway's under-23 team. Fjørtoft was capped once for the senior team and made his only appearance on 22 January 2004 in Norway's 3–0 win over Sweden in an international friendly played in Hong Kong.

Coaching career
Fjørtoft was head coach at former Toppserien team Fortuna Ålesund in 2009. Fjørtoft took over after the team finished the 2009 season in 12th, the bottom position, and were relegated. Fjørtoft left the club at the end of the 2010 season.

Fjørtoft became assistant coach at Aalesund in 2015 under head coach Trond Fredriksen, but was removed from this position in July 2016. He took over as assistant coach at Hødd three weeks later.

In 2017 and 2018, he coached Norwegian third tier club Brattvåg together with Rune Ulvestad.

Personal life
He is a distant relative of fellow footballer Jan Åge Fjørtoft.

References

1975 births
Living people
Norwegian footballers
Norway international footballers
Norway under-21 international footballers
Norway youth international footballers
Eliteserien players
Allsvenskan players
IL Hødd players
Molde FK players
Rosenborg BK players
Hammarby Fotboll players
Aalesunds FK players
Expatriate footballers in Sweden
Norwegian expatriate footballers
Norwegian expatriate sportspeople in Sweden
People from Haram, Norway
Sportspeople from Ålesund

Association football midfielders